Mashū (AOE-425) is the lead ship of the s of the Japanese Maritime Self-Defense Force. She was commissioned on 3 April 2006.

Construction and career
She was laid down on 21 January 2002 and launched on 5 February 2003. Commissioned on 3 April 2006 with the hull number AOE-425.

Gallery

References

External links

Auxiliary ships of the Japan Maritime Self-Defense Force
Ships built by Hitachi Zosen Corporation
Mashū-class replenishment ships
2003 ships